Zantop Air Transport was a United States airline formed from Zantop Flying Service in 1962.  The Civil Aeronautics Board approved transfer of the operating certificate of Coastal Airlines to Zantop Air Transport, which had incorporated and become a supplemental air carrier.  The former company had been a hauler for the Big Three automakers.  With the new arrangement Zantop could provide individually waybilled services.  The original founders of Zantop Flying Services, the Zantop brothers, all sold their stock and resigned from the company in 1966, at which time it became Universal Airlines, Inc.

The airline was based at Wayne County Airport, Inkster, Michigan.

Zantop Flying Service
Zantop Flying Service' was a United States air service formed by brothers Duane, Lloyd, Howard and Elroy Zantop as a partnership in 1946.  The base of operations for the new company was Jackson, Michigan.  At first, the fledgling company used light aircraft, and performed cargo duties for General Motors.  In 1952 the company obtained a commercial operators permit and began to service Chrysler and Ford.  A year later in 1953 they moved the operations to Wayne Major Airport, now Detroit Metro Airport.

The company continued under that name until becoming Zantop Air Transport in 1962

Zantop International Airlines
Zantop International Airlines was incorporated in May, 1972 with 100% of the stock being owned by the Zantop family.

Fleet 
The Zantop Air Transport fleet consists of the following aircraft as of 1966:

Incidents and accidents 
28 July 1966 - Curtiss C-46A-45-CU N9905F 
16 June 1966 - Curtiss C-46A-60-CK N10415 2 Fatlities
14 October 1965 - Armstrong Whitworth AW-650 Arg N601Z 
13 September 1965 - Curtiss C-46D-5-CU N5132B 
30 December 1964 - Curtiss C-46A-45-CU N608Z 4 Fatalities
20 November 1964 - Curtiss C-46F-1-CU N3971B 
30 June 1964 - Douglas C-54A-5-DC N188S 
7 December 1963 - Curtiss C-46A-20-CU N609Z 3 Fatalities 
16 Feb 1963 - Curtiss C-46F-1-CU N616Z
14 November 1961 Douglas DC-4 N30061

See also 
 List of defunct airlines of the United States

References 

 
Defunct airlines of the United States
Airlines established in 1946
Airlines disestablished in 1962
1946 establishments in Michigan
Airlines established in 1962
Airlines disestablished in 1966